The Marathi people are the Marathi-speaking migrants from present day Maharashtra and North Karnataka regions, who migrated to Uttar Pradesh during medieval period. The Marathi people, especially the Marathi Brahmins migrated to the Hindu holy city of Benares and other parts of Uttar Pradesh during the Medieval Period of India and dominated the intellectual life of the city and established an important presence at the Mughal and other north Indian courts. According to the Economic Times, The Marathi population in Uttar Pradesh is now mainly concentrated in Kanpur, Varanasi, Prayagraj, Jhansi and Lucknow.

References 

Social groups of Uttar Pradesh